Agnieszka Wojtkowska (born 30 January 1987) is a Polish badminton player.

Achievements

BWF International Challenge/Series (5 titles, 15 runners-up)
Women's doubles

Mixed doubles

  BWF International Challenge tournament
  BWF International Series tournament
  BWF Future Series tournament

References

External links 
 

1987 births
Living people
Sportspeople from Poznań
Polish female badminton players